Hargreaves is a surname, and may refer to:

 Aaron Hargreaves (born 1986), Canadian football player
 Adam Hargreaves (born 1963), British author of children's books & son of Roger Hargreaves
 Alberto Hargreaves, (born 1929) Portuguese architect and urbanist
 Alice Hargreaves, née Liddell (1852-1934), inspiration for the well known book, Alice in Wonderland
 Alison Hargreaves (1962–1995), British mountain climber
 Alistair Hargreaves (born 1986), South African rugby union player
 Amy Hargreaves (born 1970), American actress
 Andrew Raikes Hargreaves (born 1955), British politician
 Andy Hargreaves (academic) (born 1951), English academic
 Andy Hargreaves (musician), English rock drummer
 Anne Hargreaves (1870–1923), English-born missionary teacher in Philippines
 Brad Hargreaves (born 1971), American drummer
 Bryn Hargreaves (born 1985), English rugby league player
 Cain C. Hargreaves from Earl Cain
 Charlie Hargreaves (1896–1979), American basketball player
 Chris Hargreaves (born 1971), English footballer
 Christine Hargreaves (1929–1984), English actress
 David Hargreaves (born 1939), British education administrator
 Frances Hargreaves (1955–2017), South African actress
 Fred Hargreaves (1884–1960), English footballer
 Frederick James Hargreaves (1891–1970), British astronomer
 George Hargreaves (born 1952), American landscape designer
 George Hargreaves (politician) (born 1957), British religious minister, politician, record producer and songwriter
 Harold Hargreaves (born 1876), British Indian archaeologist
 Harry Hargreaves (footballer) (1889–1975), English footballer
 Harry Hargreaves (cartoonist) (1922–2004), English cartoonist
 Herbert Hargreaves (1912–1990), English cricketer
 Ian Hargreaves (born 1951), British journalist
 Jack Hargreaves (1911–1994), British author and television presenter & brother of Ronald Hargreaves
 James Hargreaves (1720–1778), English weaver and inventor
 James Hargreaves (chemist) (1834–1915), English chemist and inventor
 James Hargreaves (English cricketer) (1859–1922), American born English cricketer
 James Hargreaves (New Zealand cricketer) (1868-1924), New Zealand cricketer 
 Jared Waerea-Hargreaves (born 1989), Australian rugby league player
 Jim Hargreaves (born 1950), former Canadian ice hockey player
 Joe Hargreaves (footballer, fl. 1912–1924), English footballer for Bradford City
 Joe Hargreaves (footballer, born 1915) (1915–1992), English football forward for Rossendale United, Rochdale and Stalybridge Celtic
 Johanna Hargreaves (born 1963), British television actress
 John Hargreaves (disambiguation), several people 
 Josh Hargreaves (1870–1954), English footballer
 Ken Hargreaves (born 1939), British politician
 Kenneth Hargreaves (1903–1990), British soldier and industrialist
 Linda Hargreaves, British actress
 Owen Hargreaves (born 1981), Canadian-born English professional footballer
 Peter Hargreaves (born 1946), British business man, founder of Hargreaves Lansdown
 Reginald Hargreaves (1852–1926), English cricketer
 Roger Hargreaves (1935–1988), British author of children's books (Mr Men) & father of Adam Hargreaves
 Ronald Hargreaves (1908-1962), British psychiatrist & brother of Jack Hargreaves
 Ted Hargreaves (1943–2005), Canadian ice hockey player
 Vernon Hargreaves III (born 1995), American football player

See also 
Hargreave (surname)
Hargrave (surname)

English-language surnames